Yūsei, Yusei or Yuusei is a masculine Japanese given name.

Possible writings
Yūsei can be written using different combinations of kanji characters. Some examples: 

勇星, "courage, star"
勇成, "courage, turn into"
勇盛, "courage, prosper"
勇誠, "courage, true"
勇正, "courage, righteous"
勇政, "courage, politics"
勇生, "courage, life"
勇精, "courage, vitality"
勇清, "courage, pure"
雄星, "masculine, star"
雄成, "masculine, turn into"
雄盛, "masculine, prosper"
雄誠, "masculine, true"
雄正, "masculine, righteous"
雄政, "masculine, politics"
雄生, "masculine, life"
雄精, "masculine, vitality"
雄清, "masculine, pure"
優星, "superiority, star"
優成, "superiority, turn into"
優生, "superiority, life"
優正, "superiority, righteous"
祐星, "to help, star"
祐誠, "to help,  true"
友星, "friend, star"
友正, "friend, righteous"
有星, "to have, star"
有誠, "to have, true"
悠星, "long time, star"
悠正, "long time, righteous"

The name can also be written in hiragana ゆうせい or katakana ユウセイ.

Notable people with the name
, Japanese baseball player
, Japanese footballer
, Japanese manga artist
, Japanese footballer
, Japanese voice actor
, Japanese footballer
, Japanese judoka
, Japanese basketball player

Fictional characters
, protagonist of the anime series Yu-Gi-Oh! 5D's

Japanese masculine given names